Jobe'z World is a 2018 American comedy film directed by Michael M. Bilandic, starring Jason Grisell and Theodore Bouloukos.

Cast
 Jason Grisell as Jobe
 Theodore Bouloukos as Royce
 Stephen Payne as Ron
 Owen Kline as Zane
 Jeremy O. Harris as Jax
 Lindsay Burdge as Linda
 Sean Price Williams as Brad
 Keith Poulson as Frank
 Jason Giampietro as Joey
 Kate Lyn Sheil as Trish
 Jamie Granato as Trevor
 Natalie Swan as Lara
 Brian Allen Jackson as Adam
 Stephen Gurewitz as Radio DJ

Release
The film was released in theatres on 11 January 2019.

Reception
Richard Brody of The New Yorker wrote that while the film is "uneven", the film's inspirations "redeem its longueurs and virtually blast them off the screen and out of memory", and Bouloukos is a "secret weapon of independent cinema".

Frank Scheck of The Hollywood Reporter wrote that Bilandic "fails to infuse the painfully thin proceedings with any narrative momentum or comic flair, resulting in an oppressive weirdness for weirdness’ sake."

Mark Jenkins of NPR wrote that "at a mere 67 minutes, the movie is not exactly sprightly", as well as that while the screenplay "begins with a promising scenario", the characters are "sketchy", and the dialogue "needs a couple more spins through the word processor."

References

External links
 
 

American comedy films
2018 comedy films